The Col de Vars, elevation 2108 m (6916 ft) is a high mountain pass in the Alps between the departments of Hautes-Alpes and Alpes-de-Haute-Provence in France.

It connects the Ubaye Valley with the Queyras valley and Embrun.

It is traversed by highway D 902, which leads from Saint-Paul-sur-Ubaye in the southeast to Vars and on to Guillestre in the northwest.

The pass has been included in the Tour de France 33 times since 1922, when Philippe Thys crossed the pass for the first time. (Tour de France 1922 - 2000)

See also
 List of highest paved roads in Europe
 List of mountain passes

External links 
de Vars (Col de Vars) - Tour Facts)
Le col de Vars dans le Tour de France) (French)
Col de Vars on Google Maps (Tour de France classic climbs)
Cycling up to the Col de Vars: data, profile, map, photos and description 

Vars
Vars
Landforms of Hautes-Alpes
Transport in Provence-Alpes-Côte d'Azur